Miller Grove High School is a public high school located in unincorporated Miller Grove, Texas (USA) and classified as a 1A school by the UIL.  It is part of the Miller Grove Independent School District located in southwest Hopkins County.  The school has a Cumby, Texas address and is sometimes referred to as Cumby Miller Grove. In 2015, the school was rated "Met Standard" by the Texas Education Agency.

Athletics
The Miller Grove Hornets compete in these sports - 

Cross Country, Volleyball, Basketball, Track, and Baseball.

State Titles
Boys Cross Country - 
2014(1A), 2017(1A), 2018(1A), 2019(1A), 2020(1A), 2021(1A)
Girls Cross Country - 
2015(1A), 2019(1A), 2022(1A)

References

External links
Miller Grove ISD

Public high schools in Texas
Public middle schools in Texas